Eduardo Roldán de Aranguiz López (born 13 September 1977 in Vitoria-Gasteiz, Álava), known as Edu Roldán, is a Spanish retired footballer who played as a midfielder.

External links

1977 births
Living people
Footballers from Vitoria-Gasteiz
Spanish footballers
Association football midfielders
Segunda División players
Segunda División B players
Tercera División players
Deportivo Alavés B players
Real Zaragoza B players
SD Eibar footballers
Real Unión footballers
SD Huesca footballers
Zamora CF footballers
SD Ejea players
CD Aurrerá de Vitoria footballers